Gaultheria mucronata (syn. Pernettya mucronata), the prickly heath, is a species of flowering plant in the family Ericaceae, native to southern Argentina and Chile.

In volcanic areas of southern Chile Gaultheria mucronata is one of the dominant plant species above the tree line.

Description
It is dioecious, meaning that both male and female plants must be grown together in order to produce fruit. It prefers moist, shaded conditions.

Edibility
Its fruits are edible when ripe; they are sweet and juicy but somewhat tasteless, hence useful as survival food.

Cultivars
Numerous cultivars have been selected for garden use, of which the following have gained the Royal Horticultural Society's Award of Garden Merit:- 
'Bell's Seedling' (deep red fruit)
'Crimsonia' (large crimson fruits)
'Mulberry Wine' (purple fruit)
'Wintertime' (white fruits)

Etymology
Gaultheria is named for Dr. Jean François Gaulthier (1708-56), a Swedish-Canadian botanist from Quebec.

The Latin specific epithet mucronata means “prickly”, referring to the foliage.

References

External links

 Gaultheria mucronata info

mucronata
Flora of southern Chile
Berries
Dioecious plants